Yengabad-e Chay (also Romanized as Yengābād-e Chāy; also known as Yengīābād-e Chā'ī) is a village in Sheykhdarabad Rural District, in the Central District of Meyaneh County, East Azerbaijan Province, Iran. At the 2006 census, its population was 178, in 43 families.

References 

Populated places in Meyaneh County